Zrąb-Kolonia  is a village in the administrative district of Gmina Skierbieszów, within Zamość County, Lublin Voivodeship, in eastern Poland.

The village has a population of 260.

References

Villages in Zamość County